Roger M. Lhermitte (May 28, 1920-November 21, 2016) was a French meteorologist who "pioneered the development of meteorological Doppler radar." His career extended from the 1950s until his death where he made numerous contributions to the field of Radar Meteorology resulting in over 100 publications and numerous patents.

Early life and education 
Roger Lhermitte was born in Ergal, a hamlet of Jouars-Pontchartrain in the Yvelines, France, on 28 May 1920. During the occupation of Germany in France in World War II, he was compulsorily enlisted by the Germans to work for Siemens in Berlin. "While in Berlin, he made numerous trips to bomb shelters for safety, an experience he likened many times to Kurt Vonnegut’s descriptions of Dresden in Slaughterhouse Five. Kurt’s brother, Bernard Vonnegut, was later to become one of Roger’s closest colleagues in atmospheric electricity".

After the end of the war, Lhermitte continued his education to pursue his doctoral thesis at the Faculté des Sciences de L’Université de Paris under the guidance of Professor Pauthenier. The subject of his thesis work was titled “Contribution à L'Étude des Précipitations Par L’analyse des Échos de Pluies Obtenus à L’aide de Radars” which, roughly translated to english was “Contributions to the study of Precipitations via the Analysis of Radar Data.”

The thesis begins with the sentence "La presence des gouttes de pluie d'une precipitation provoque la diffusion des ondes centrimetriques et par suite l'apparition d'echos sur les indicateurs des radars utilisant ces longueurs d'onde", which roughly translates to "The presence of precipitation provokes the scattering of centimeter wavelength radiation, which is followed by the appearance of echos on radars using this same wavelength." This is the beginning of decades long research in atmospheric science that led to over 100 publications and numerous patents.

Career 

Lhermitte began his career as a scientist at "la Météorologie nationale," first in the city of Trappes, France, and later on Magny-les-Hameaux.

Lhermitte first went to North America as a visitor to the Stormy Weather Group in Montreal, QC. He left Paris on January 2, 1955, arriving the next day. There he met Walter Hitcshfeld, J.S. Marshall, K. Gunn and T.East at McGill University. On that trip he met David Atlas whom he would work with in the future. The next year, he visited the Blue Hill Observatory in Boston, MA, making it his first visit to the United States. There he worked with Atlas, R. Donaldson, Edwin Kessler and others. The "early work there led to the installation of the WSR-57 radar installation network."

After these two visits, went back to France and stayed there a few years.

After a few visits to North America, Lhermitte emigrated to the United States in January 1961 to work with Atlas at the Air Force Cambridge
Research Laboratories (AFCRL). He left the AFCRL for the Sperry Rand Research center in New York, NY in 1963. Some of his work included exploring the use of pulsed Doppler radars to extend the capabilities of conventional Doppler radars in allowing for range discrimination.

In 1964 Edwin Kessler had just become director of National Severe Storms Laboratory (NSSL) and was coordinating efforts to build a weather radar program. He had maintained contact with Roger, and reached out to him to join this new program. Lhermitte left the Sperry Rand Research center in early 1964 for this new venture to work with Kessler, K. Wilk, Dale Sirmans and others. By the end of 1964, they had completed a pulsed 3 cm radar.

In early 1967, Lhermitte left the NSSL for the Wave Propagation Laboratory (WPL) in Boulder, CO, at the request of G. Benton who was the director of ERL. He was to work with G. Little on the formation of the Wave Propagation Laboratory (WPL). In 1970, he took a position as a professor at the Rosenstiel School of Marine and Atmospheric Science at the University of Miami. It was during his time at the University of Miami that he was the first to develop the 94-GHz doppler radar for the measurement of clouds.
 The weather radar was built in 1987. Its design and implementation is described in Lhermitte's 1987 paper "A 94-GHz Doppler Radar for Cloud Observations". The observation by  Lhermitte of Mie oscillations in the 94 GHz spectrum paved the way to the measurement of drop size distributions in precipitating clouds. This was later explored by Pavlos Kollias et al in a paper entitled "Why Mie?":

Retirement 
Lhermitte retired as Professor Emeritus in the early nineties. Near the end of his career, he decided to write a book on his experiences with centimeter and millimeter wavelength radars in meteorology. It was not written to be a comprehensive review of radars in meteorology, but rather his perspective on it. It contains many original ideas developed by him.

Lhermitte died on November 21, 2016 in Miami, FL.

Contributions to the field of Radar Meteorology 
From an article on the 30th Conference on Radar Meteorology, Roger Lhermitte's contributions as listed

30th Conference on Radar Meteorology (A Tribute to Roger Lhermitte) 
The 30th Conference on Radar Meteorology was held in tribute for Lhermitte, who was 82 at the time. An article in BAMS (2002) describes the tribute:

Publications

Patents 
 Atmospheric motion non-coherent pulse doppler system  (July 6, 1965)
 Method and means of determining variability of atmospheric motion with respect to altitude (July 27, 1965)
 Atmospheric Motion Coherent Pulse Doppler Radar System (October 12, 1965)
 Radar tornado alarm (September 6, 1966)
 Waveform Averaging and Contouring Device For Weather Radars And The Like (January 30, 1968)

Selected publications 
 
 Lhermitte, R. (1959), La representation directe du spectre de fluctuation des echos radars donnes par des precipitations, 248, 1554-1556
 Lhermitte, R. (1958), Sur la fluctuation des echos de precipitations, C. R. Acad. Sci., 246, 1245-1248
 Lhermitte, R. (1957), Sur une method d'observation d'intensite des echos de pluie, C. R. Acad. Sci., 244, 2955-2957
 Lhermitte, R. (1952), Les "bandes superieurs" dans la structure verticale des echos de pluie, C. R. Acad. Sci., 235, 1414-1416
 Lhermitte, R. (1964) "Doppler radars as severe storm sensors." Bulletin of the American Meteorological Society 45.9 (1964): 587-596
 Lhermitte, R. (1970) "Dual-Doppler radar observation of convective storm circulation." Preprints 14th Conf. Radar Meteor. Tucson, Amer. Meteor. Sco., 139-144
 Lhermitte, R., and R. Serafin (1984) “Pulse-to-pulse coherent Doppler sonar signal processing techniques,” J. Atmos. and Ocean. Technol., vol. 1, pp 293–308
 Lhermitte, R. (1987) "A 94 GHz Doppler Radar for Cloud Observations." J. Atmos. Ocean . Tech., 4 (1), 36‐48
 Lhermitte, R. (1990) "Attenuation and Scattering of Millimeter Wavelength Radiation by Clouds and Precipitation." J. Atmos. Ocean Tech., 7, 464‐479

References 

French meteorologists
Doppler effects
Radar meteorology
Radar pioneers
1920 births
2016 deaths
University of Miami faculty